The common patas monkey (Erythrocebus patas), also known as the wadi monkey or hussar monkey, is a ground-dwelling monkey distributed over semi-arid areas of West Africa, and into East Africa.

Taxonomy 
There is some confusion surrounding if there are valid subspecies, with some listing four, others three, and others listing two: the western Erythrocebus patas patas (with a black nose) and the eastern E. patas pyrrhonotus (with a white nose). However, it was later discovered that the nose colour used to separate these subspecies could change to white during pregnancy in females, as well as in general as animals aged, and E. patas pyrrhonotus in Kenya often did not have white noses, thus Mammal Species of the World has classified E. patas as a monotypic species.

The genus status of the species has previously been in flux. Colin Groves first argued the species was closely related to Cercopithecus aethiops in 1989, based on anatomical morphology. Phylogenetic evidence from 2003 appeared to validate him, finding the patas monkey to form a clade within the vervet genus Cercopithecus together with C. aethiops and C. lhoesti, and based on this study Erythrocebus was proposed to be sunk into synonymy with Cercopithecus. However, more recent studies have found this interpretation of Cercopithecus to be paraphyletic, and thus many species in Cercopithecus have since been reclassified to numerous new genera and species, with C. aethiops moved to Chlorocebus and C. lhoesti to Allochrocebus. Erythrocebus is thus now thought to be a distinct genus.

Erythrocebus was previously thought to be a monotypic genus containing only E. patas. However, a 2017 study proposed splitting E. patas into three species (E. patas sensu stricto, E. poliphaeus, and E. baumstarki) based on morphological differences and heavy geographic separation between taxa, with the IUCN Red List and American Society of Mammalogists following through with this.

Description 
Adult males are considerably larger than adult females, which average  in length. 
Adult males average  and adult females , showing a high degree of sexual dimorphism.

The life span in the wild can be up to about 20 years.

Distribution and habitat 
It is found in many parts of central, western, and eastern Africa. It also has been introduced to Puerto Rico. The species avoids dense woodlands and lives in more open tropical savanna.

Behavior 
The common patas monkey lives in multi-female groups of up to 60 individuals (although much larger aggregations have been reported). The group contains just one adult male for most of the year. During the breeding season, there are multi-male influxes into the group. Once juvenile males reach sexual maturity (around the age of four years) they leave the group, usually joining all-male groups. The adult females in the group initiate movement of the group with the male following their lead.

The common patas monkey feeds on insects, gum, seeds, and tubers, a diet more characteristic of much smaller primates.

Female social organization 
Variation in the female social structure of patas monkeys has been observed across different populations. This variation may be dependent on food resources, as conflict between individuals is often a result of competition for limited resources. Higher rates of conflict over dense, but limited, food, such as fruit bushes, is associated with more stable, well defined dominance hierarchies than habitats with more diffuse resources, such as insects. Variation in the availability of these resources has been associated with variation in dominance hierarchies among females.

Conflict among females has also shown the presence of recognition among matrilineal relatives. It has been observed that, shortly after conflicts among two females, patas monkeys often act differently toward each other than if they had not been in conflict. Females often reconcile with each other by activities such as sitting together and grooming. While this reconciliatory behavior is observed even between unrelated individuals, it is most common among matrilineal relatives. Dominance structure has relatively little effect on the probability of reconciliation occurring, except that the alpha-female is the least reconciliatory of the females. Affiliation toward matrilineal relatives is common in other primates as well, such as vervet monkeys.

Male social organization 
Mating in common patas monkeys is seasonal and occurs during the wet season. During periods when females are not receptive, relatively stable groups with one adult resident male and several females are the norm. This leaves an excess of males that either form all male groups or live on their own. During the mating season, resident males may be chased away by invading solitary males. This usually results in the formation of multi-male, multi-female groups shortly thereafter, as more males invade a group. The new resident male does not chase away subordinate invading males, but rather focuses on mating with females. At the end of the mating season, one-male, multi-female groups stabilize. One male remains as the resident male and chases other males away. In some instances, submissive males are tolerated by the resident male for short periods of time; however, they rarely remain in the group for more than several days.

Young males have been observed to leave their natal groups anywhere from two to four years of age. However, one study showed that most juveniles left before they were three, which is before most males reach sexual maturity. This contrasts with an earlier study in which juveniles were observed to leave later, at sexual maturity, indicating that there may be variation between groups. The reason young males leave their natal group is also contested. Dominant males have been observed to act aggressively toward younger males in captivity. However, observations of wild patas monkeys has shown young males leaving the group in which they were born without any aggressive behavior from the adult male. The juveniles, in the time shortly before they leave, spend increasingly less and less time with the adult females in the group. However, juvenile males do not change the amount of time they spend near the adult male. This may indicate weakening of matrilineal ties, rather than male aggression, as the main reason juveniles disperse from their natal group.

Alarm calls 
Common patas monkeys have several distinct alarm calls that warn members in the group of predators. Different alarm calls are given by different group members (i.e. adult females, adult males, juveniles, etc.) and certain alarm calls are distinctive of different types of predators. Unlike other primates, patas monkeys rarely take refuge from predators in trees. This is most likely due to the relatively sparse tree cover in patas monkey habitats. While patas monkeys usually run on the ground away from predators, individuals have been observed to attack predators such as jackals and wildcats. This behavior has been observed in both males and females.

In popular culture  
The relationship between the patas monkey and the whistling thorn acacia may have inspired The Lorax by Dr. Seuss.

Gallery

See also 
 Zoo Boise, site of a zoo break in, during which a patas monkey was killed

Notes

References

External links

 Primate Info Net Erythrocebus patas Factsheet

Erythrocebus
Mammals described in 1775
Taxa named by Johann Christian Daniel von Schreber